The South West Seismic Zone (also identified as SWSZ) is a major intraplate earthquake province located in the south west of Western Australia. It was known earlier as the Yandanooka – Cape Riche Lineament, corresponds to the physiographic boundary known as the Meckering Line, and also the junction between Swanland and Salinaland.

 The zone exists within an Archaean Shield structure called the Yilgarn Block. The identified geological subdivisions within this Precambrian structure do not show an obvious relation to the seismicity.

The zone represents a significant seismic hazard to Perth. More than six thousand earthquakes have occurred in the SWSZ in the years 1968 – 2002. Meckering, Cadoux and Burakin earthquakes originated in the SWSZ. More recent events have occurred to the south in Lake Muir in 2018 and Arthur River in 2022.

The zone and the explanation of it, has been titled Perthquake in the Catalyst programme on the ABC in 2001.

Temporal variation of the events in the region have been analysed over time.
In the 2000s, monitoring and instrumentation was developed in the region.

Table of earthquakes
List of earthquakes of magnitude 4 or more in Southwestern Australia 1920–1961
(based in part on the records of Perth Observatory 1923–1959 and
Mundaring Geophysical Observatory 1959–1980).

Notes

See also
 Earthquakes in Western Australia

References
 Featherstone, Will (1998) Geodetic monitoring of the South West Seismic Zone paper at Curtin University of Technology 24 25 September 1998 to the Advances in Deformation Monitoring International Workshop

External links

Geology of Western Australia
Earthquakes in Western Australia
South West (Western Australia)
Seismic zones of Australia